The 2020–21 Wake Forest Demon Deacons women's basketball team represented Wake Forest University during the 2020–21 NCAA Division I women's basketball season. The Demon Deacons, were led by ninth year head coach Jen Hoover, are members of the Atlantic Coast Conference and played their home games at the Lawrence Joel Veterans Memorial Coliseum.

The Demon Deacons finished the season 12–13 and 8–10 in ACC play to finish in a tie for ninth place.  As the ninth seed in the ACC tournament, they defeated North Carolina in the Second Round before losing to Louisville in the Quarterfinals.  They received an at-large bid to the NCAA tournament as the nine seed in the Alamo Region.  In the tournament, they lost in the First Round to eight seed .

Previous season
They finished the season 16–16 and 7–11 in ACC play to finish in a tie for eleventh place.  As the thirteenth seed in the ACC tournament, they defeated North Carolina in the First Round and Virginia Tech in the Second Round before losing to Florida State in the Quarterfinals.  The NCAA tournament and WNIT were cancelled due to the COVID-19 outbreak.

Off-season

Departures

Recruiting Class

Source:

Roster

Schedule

Source:

|-
!colspan=6 style=| Regular Season

|-
!colspan=6 style=| ACC Women's Tournament

|-
!colspan=6 style=";"| NCAA tournament

Rankings

Coaches did not release a Week 2 poll and AP does not release a final poll.

See also
 2020–21 Wake Forest Demon Deacons men's basketball team

References

Wake Forest Demon Deacons women's basketball seasons
Wake Forest
Wake Forest women's basketball
Wake Forest women's basketball
Wake Forest